Smir Dam is an earth-filled embankment dam in northern Morocco, to the southeast of Nakhla Dam and  west of M'diq. It is at the confluence of the Smir and El-lile wadis and has a  saddle dam adjacent to the main dam. The primary purpose of the dam is water supply to the city of Tetouan,  to the south. The dam was completed in 1991. The reservoir impounded by the dam has been designated as part of a Ramsar site since 2019.

References

External links

 
Photograph

Dams in Morocco
Geography of Tanger-Tetouan-Al Hoceima
Dams completed in 1991
1991 establishments in Morocco
Ramsar sites in Morocco
20th-century architecture in Morocco